Cole Chase Hudson (born May 15, 2002), known professionally as Huddy (formerly known as Lil Huddy or LilHuddy), is an American social media personality, singer, and actor, known for co-founding the TikTok collective the Hype House, and popularizing the e-boy fashion style and subculture. According to Billboard, he is one of the top 10 music influencers on TikTok, with over 30 million followers, and one of the most influential people on the platform. He has also been cited by Paper as an important figure in the 2020s pop punk revival.

Early life
Hudson was born in Stockton, California to school teachers Cole and Tamora Hudson. He has two sisters. Growing up in Stockton, he became interested in fashion at a young age and discovering pop punk bands like My Chemical Romance, Blink-182 and Fall Out Boy from his older sister's iPod. In his teens, he began being bullied, which led to him becoming suicidal and eventually transferred to online schooling.

Hudson attended Bear Creek High School for his freshman and sophomore years, before moving to online schooling in order to continue his social media career. He graduated early in his junior year by taking three extra classes per semester.

He had on/off relationship from December 2019 to January 2022 with influencer Charli D'amelio

Career
Hudson began his career on musical.ly, now TikTok. In December 2019, Hudson co-founded the TikTok collective known as the Hype House with other social media personalities such as Daisy Keech, Alex Warren, Kouvr Annon, and Thomas Petrou. He also has a YouTube channel.

Hudson is represented by talent agency WME.

In December 2020, he was signed to Interscope Records by Adam Mersel, despite Hudson only having a recorded "a few scrappy demos". Hudson starred alongside Sydney Sweeney in Downfalls High, the film adaptation of Machine Gun Kelly's album Tickets to My Downfall. The film premiered on January 15, 2021, and gained over 16 million views in its first weekend. He then released his debut hit single "21st Century Vampire" on January 21. On February 18 he released his second single "The Eulogy of You and Me", which was co-written and produced by Travis Barker. April 22, 2021 released his third single "America’s Sweetheart", an emotional ballad about a breakup and its outcomes. The music video features a cameo from internet celebrity and dancer, Charli D'Amelio. On August 6, he released the single "Don't Freak Out" featuring Iann Dior, Travis Barker and Tyson Ritter and announced his debut album Teenage Heartbreak which was then released on September 17, 2021.

Influences
Hudson cites Justin Bieber, BTS, Shawn Mendes, Billie Eilish and One Direction as his fashion influences, and Travis Barker, Machine Gun Kelly, Olivia Rodrigo, My Chemical Romance and Blink-182 as his musical influences.

Discography

Studio albums

Singles

Filmography

Television

Internet

Awards and nominations

References

External links
 
 

2002 births
American TikTokers
American YouTubers
21st-century American male musicians
American male singers
Living people
American alternative rock musicians
American male pop singers
American rock singers
Pop punk musicians
Musicians from Stockton, California
Singers from California